The Mini-Hawk TH.E.01 Tiger-Hawk was a single-seat sport aircraft designed in the United States in the early 1970s and marketed for home building. It was a conventional, low-wing cantilever monoplane with a cockpit enclosed by a bubble canopy. The wings were detachable for ease of storage or towing and could be rigged in around ten minutes. The undercarriage was of fixed, tricycle type with spats fitted to the prototype. It was an all-metal construction, and the aircraft could be built from plans or a kit.

Specifications (prototype)

See also

Notes

References
 

 

1970s United States sport aircraft
Homebuilt aircraft
Low-wing aircraft
Aircraft first flown in 1974